David Richard Campbell (born 7 February 1948) is a Canadian-American arranger, composer, and conductor. He has worked on over 450 gold and platinum albums by artists of a wide range of genres, including Rush, Ariana Grande, Harry Styles, Muse, Michael Jackson, Aaliyah, Evanescence, Beyoncé, Aerosmith, Garth Brooks, and various albums by his son Beck.

Early life and education
Campbell was born in Toronto, Ontario. His father, D. Warren Campbell, was from Winnipeg, Manitoba, and was attending seminary in Toronto in order to become a Presbyterian minister. Campbell subsequently was assigned to a church in Pittsburgh, taking his family with him, before settling in Seattle. Campbell took up the violin at age 9. At age 12, he began venturing into orchestration, studying the works of Bartók, Schoenberg and Stravinsky.

In the late 1960s, after studying at Manhattan School of Music, Campbell moved from New York to Los Angeles and began studying pop music. He studied the music of The Beatles, Leonard Cohen, and The Rolling Stones, and he played bluegrass music for crowds in line for movies in Westwood Village.

Career
At age 23, Campbell played on his first major album, Tapestry, by Carole King. This led to his first arranger role, for King's Rhymes and Reasons album. Campbell also played viola on recording sessions such as Marvin Gaye's "Let's Get It On" and Bill Withers' "Lean on Me".
Since then, he has gone on to arrange songs for such artists as Bob Dylan, The Rolling Stones, Bon Jovi, Dream Theater, Metallica, Paul McCartney, Radiohead, Jessie J, Juanes, Tim McGraw, Adele, Ricky Martin, Barbra Streisand, and Miley Cyrus.

As a composer, David has written music for many films including Joy, Paper Tigers and Colombia: magia salvaje.  He has also arranged and orchestrated music for over 80 films including Annie (2014), Foxcatcher (2014), August: Osage County (2013), Rock of Ages (2012), Dreamgirls (2007), North Country (2005), and Brokeback Mountain (2005).  In 2010 he worked with Nigel Godrich on the score for Scott Pilgrim vs. The World. In 2016, he co-composed the 40-minute ballet Rules of the Game with Pharrell Williams.

David has guest-conducted the Los Angeles Philharmonic and the Hollywood Bowl Orchestra at the Hollywood Bowl for Faith Hill, Death Cab for Cutie, Ray LaMontagne, Beck, Sheryl Crow, Willie Nelson, and The xx. He collaborated with Muse for the performance of "Survival", the official song of the London Olympics. He also collaborated with Beck for the Lincoln Motor Company ad campaign, "Hello, Again", which featured a live performance of Beck's "Sound and Vision" cover and included 167 live musicians playing simultaneously. In February 2009 Campbell arranged Radiohead's "15 Step" for the band's collaboration with the USC Marching Band at the 2009 Grammy Awards. He conducted the Los Angeles Philharmonic, as well as arranged and orchestrated the music for Beck's Song Reader concert at the Walt Disney Concert Hall, which featured many performers, including Childish Gambino, Juanes, Anne Hathaway, John C. Reilly, Jack Black, and Jarvis Cocker. He arranged and orchestrated for the Seattle Symphony and Pickwick's Sonic Evolution show on 6 June 2014.

In 2003, he served as conductor of the Melbourne Symphony Orchestra during their one-night performance with Kiss, which was released on the album Kiss Symphony: Alive IV. During the concert, Campbell and the members of the orchestra wore the iconic Kiss makeup along with the members of the band.

In 2018, for the LA Phil's 100th anniversary celebrations, David wrote arrangements for Chris Martin's and Corinne Bailey Rae's performances at Disney Hall, as well as Katy Perry's and Kali Uchis' performances at the Hollywood Bowl, all of which were conducted by Gustavo Dudamel.

In 2019, he wrote arrangements for and conducted the LA Philharmonic, National Symphony Orchestra and Cincinnati Orchestra for Iron & Wine's 15th anniversary of Our Endless Numbered Days.

He created the song arrangements, dance arrangements, underscoring and orchestrations for the Broadway musical Spider-Man: Turn Off the Dark.

List of album arrangements and singles
sources:

2022

Burna Boy – Love, Damini (orchestra)
Beth Hart – A Tribute to Led Zeppelin (orchestra)
Attacca Quartet – Classical Carols Covered Apple Music 
Neil Diamond – A Neil Diamond Christmas (orchestra and choir)
Capital Theatre – "Fait Accompli" (strings)
Beach House – Once Twice Melody (strings)
Michael Bublé – Higher (strings)
Ozzy Osbourne – Patient Number 9 (strings)
Elton John – The Lockdown Sessions (strings)
Eddie Vedder – Earthling (orchestra)
Dave Matthews Band – (strings)
Edgar Winter – "Brother Johnny" (strings)
Backstreet Boys – A Very Backstreet Christmas (strings)
Maria Bethânia & Pantanal" (strings)

2021

Adele – 30 (strings)
Billie Eilish – Happier Than Ever: A Love Letter to Los Angeles (orchestra)
Diane Warren – The Cave Sessions Vol. 1 (strings)
Julia Michaels – Not in Chronological Order (strings)
Jessie J – Women to the Front (strings)
Kalen Anzai – Kimi to Boku no Uta (strings)
Evanescence – The Bitter Truth (strings)
Garth Brooks & Trisha Yearwood – "Shallow" (strings)
Mau y Ricky – "Doleria" (strings)
Allie Colleen Brooks –  Stones (strings)
Diane Warren & Laura Pausini – "Io Sì" (strings)
Ben Platt – Born This Way 10th Anniversary (strings)
Lake Street Dive – "Nobody's Stopping You Now" (strings)
Cinderella – Soundtrack (orchestra)
Billy Currington – "Words" (strings)

2020

Cam – The Otherside (orchestra)
Ariana Grande – Positions (strings)
Charlie Puth – Free (strings)
Laura Pausini – Seen (strings)
Kane Brown – John Legend - Last Time I Say Sorry (strings)
Tommy Torres – Aprenderemos (strings)
Carrie Underwood – My Gift (orchestra)
Tim McGraw – Here On Earth (strings)
Garth Brooks – Fun (strings)
Bon Jovi – 2020 (strings)

2019

Harry Styles – Fine Line (orchestra)
Taylor Swift – Beautiful Ghosts (orchestra)
Leonard Cohen – Thanks for the Dance (strings)
Mark Ronson – Late Night Feelings (strings)
Melissa Etheridge – I Know You (strings)
Freya Ridings – Freya Ridings (album) (strings)
Cage the Elephant – Social Cues (strings)
Luis Fonsi – Vida (strings)
Tommy Torres – Tres Minutos (strings)
Various Artists, Beck – Music Inspired by the Film Roma (strings)
Ximena Sariñana – Cobarde (strings)
Roger Daltrey – The Who's Tommy Orchestral (orchestra)

2018

Hanson – String Theory (orchestra)
Dave Matthews Band – Come Tomorrow
Muse – Simulation Theory (brass, strings)
Carlos Rivera – Guerra (strings)
Lily Allen – No Shame (strings)
Barbra Streisand – Walls (strings)
Paul McCartney – Egypt Station (choir)
Steve Perry – Traces (strings)
The Beach Boys – The Beach Boys With The Royal Philharmonic Orchestra (full orchestra)
Roy Orbison – Unchained Melodies
The 1975 – A Brief Inquiry into Online Relationships (strings)
Sebastián Yatra, Tommy Torres – Atado Entre Tus Manos (single)
Tommy Torres – Todo Me Requerda A Ti
Tim McGraw – Gravity (strings)

2017

Billy Raffoul – 1975
Evanescence – Synthesis (orchestra)
Beck – Colors
Pauline Frechette – Follow My Heart
Cheng Lin – King of Peace (strings)
Café Tacuba – Jei Beibi (strings)
Roger Waters – Is This the Life We Really Want? (strings)
Tim McGraw – Faith Hill − The Rest of Our Life
Antonio José – Tu Boca (strings)

2016

M83 – Junk (orchestra, choir)
Dream Theater – The Astonishing (orchestra, choir)
Garth Brooks – Gunslinger (strings)
Jacqui Hylton – Beautiful
KT Tunstall – Kin
Lady Antebellum – Heart Break (strings)
Luis Fonsi – Ahi Estas Tu
Tim McGraw – Faith Hill – Keep Your Eyes on Me
Pharrell Williams – Rules of the Game (orchestra)

2015

Alejandro Sanz – Sirope (strings)
Of Monsters and Men – Beneath the Skin (brass, strings)
Tim McGraw – Damn Country Music (strings)
Tommy Torres – Ven (strings)
Colombia Magia Salvaje – Soundtrack (orchestra)
Joy – Soundtrack (orchestra)

2014

Beck – Morning Phase (strings, brass)
Christina Perri – Head or Heart (strings)
D.A. Wallach – Glowing (strings, woodwinds, brass)
David Bisbal – Tú y Yo (strings)
Garth Brooks — Man Against Machine (strings)
Jennifer Nettles – That Girl (strings, woodwinds, brass)
OK Go – Hungry Ghosts (strings)
Rascal Flatts – Rewind (strings)
The Griswolds — Be Impressive (strings)
Tim McGraw — Sundown Heaven Town (strings)
Trisha Yearwood — PrizeFighter: Hit After Hit (strings)
U2 — Songs of Innocence (Deluxe Edition)

2013

Avenged Sevenfold – Hail to the King (strings, horns)
Biffy Clyro – Opposites (strings, choir, brass, bagpipes)
Bon Jovi – What About Now (strings)
Christina Perri – A Thousand Years (strings, horns)
David Bisbal − Tú y Yo (David Bisbal album) (strings)
Dido – Girl Who Got Away (strings)
Ghost – Infestissumam (choir, score editor)
Jake Bugg – Jake Bugg (strings, choir)
Jessie J – Alive (strings)
Josh Groban – All That Echoes (strings, brass)
Miley Cyrus – Bangerz (strings)
Pink – The Truth About Love (strings)
Tim McGraw – Two Lanes of Freedom (strings)
Tommy Torres – 12 Historias (strings)

2012

Alanis Morissette – Havoc and Bright Lights (woodwinds)
Dwight Yoakam – 3 Pears (strings, brass)
Grace Potter and the Nocturnals – The Lion the Beast the Beat (strings)
Jason Mraz – Love Is a Four Letter Word (strings)
King Charles – Loveblood (horns, strings)
Marina and the Diamonds – Electra Heart (strings)
Muse – The 2nd Law (strings, brass, choir)
Rush – Clockwork Angels (strings)
Shinedown – Amaryllis (strings)
Taylor Swift – Red (strings)
The Fray – Scars & Stories (strings)

2011

Adele – 21 (strings)
Antonio Carmona – De Noche (strings, woodwinds, horns)
Avril Lavigne – Goodbye Lullaby (strings)
Christina Perri – Lovestrong (strings, percussion)
Demi Lovato – Unbroken (strings)
Evanescence – Evanescence (strings)
Journey – Greatest Hits 2
Martina McBride – Eleven (strings)
Spider-Man: Turn Off the Dark (orchestra, vocals)
Trading Yesterday – More than This (strings)
Unicorn – Z (brass, strings)
Various artists – Listen to Me: Buddy Holly (strings, percussion)
X Japan – "Jade" (orchestration with Yoshiki)

2010

Adam Lambert – For Your Entertainment (strings and horns)
Adam Lambert – Time for Miracles (strings and horns)
Alejandro Sanz – Paraiso Express (strings)
Debi Nova – Luna Nueva (strings)
Due Voci – Due Voci (strings and horns)
Jimmy Eat World – Invented (strings)
Meat Loaf – Hang Cool Teddy Bear (strings and percussion)
Michael Jackson – Michael (strings)
Miranda Cosgrove – Sparks Fly (strings)
No Machine – Toast the Toaster (strings)
The Rolling Stones – Exile on Main St. (strings)
Takako Matsu – Time for Music (strings, horns, woodwinds)
We Are the Fallen – Tear the World Down (strings)

2009

Ashley Monroe – Satisfied (strings)
Biffy Clyro – Only Revolutions (strings, brass, woodwinds)
Charlotte Gainsbourg – IRM (strings)
Crash Kings – Crash Kings (strings)
Daniel Merriweather – Love & War (strings)
Dave Matthews Band – Big Whiskey and the GrooGrux King (strings)
David Cook – David Cook (strings)
Dido – Safe Trip Home (strings)
Five for Fighting – Slice (strings)
The Fray – The Fray (strings)
Hoobastank – Fornever (strings)
Laura Izibor – Let The Truth Be Told (strings)
M. Ward – Hold Time (strings)
Maroon 5 – His Way, Our Way (big band)
Martina McBride – Shine (strings)
Oksana Grigorieva – Beautiful Heartache (strings)
Paolo Spoladore – Shiloh (choir, strings, horns, woodwinds, percussion)
Paper Route – Absence (strings)
PT Walkley – Mr. Macy Wakes Alone (strings)
Rascal Flatts – Unstoppable (strings)
Rascal Flatts – Unwrapped (strings and horns)
Small Time Sleeper – Conversations
Tim McGraw – Southern Voice (strings)
Uncle Kracker – Happy Hour (strings)

2008

Adam Green – Sixes and Sevens (strings, horns)
A Fine Frenzy – One Cell in the Sea
Augustana – Can't Love, Can't Hurt (strings)
Ayumi Hamasaki – Guilty (strings)
Beck – Modern Guilt (strings)
Carly Simon – This Kind of Love (strings)
Faith Hill – Joy To The World (big band, orchestral)
Ferras – Aliens & Rainbows (strings)
Hana Pestle – This Way (strings)
I Nine – Heavy Weighs the King (strings)
Lee Seung-Hwan – Tattoo
Lenka – Lenka (strings)
Leona Lewis – Spirit (Strings)
Louis XIV – Slick Dogs and Ponies (strings)
Metallica – Death Magnetic (strings)
My Morning Jacket – Evil Urges (strings)
Neil Diamond – Home Before Dark (strings)
Rhydian – Rhydian (strings)
Shinedown – The Sound of Madness (strings)
Simple Plan – Simple Plan (strings)
Tommy Torres – Tarde O Temprano (strings)
Trisha Yearwood – Heaven, Heartache and the Power of Love (strings)
Was (Not Was) – Boo! (strings)

2007

Air – Pocket Symphony (strings)
Ashley Tisdale – Headstrong (strings)
Avril Lavigne – The Best Damn Thing (strings)
Ayumi Hamasaki – Together When...
Carina Ricco – Viaje Personal
Celine Dion – Taking Chances (strings)
Charlotte Gainsbourg – 5:55 (strings)
David Vandervelde – The Moonstation House Band (strings)
Enrique Iglesias – Insomniac (strings)
Garth Brooks – The Ultimate Hits (strings)
Jimmy Eat World – Chase This Light (strings)
Juanes – La vida... es un ratico (strings)
Kid Rock – Rock n Roll Jesus (strings)
Linkin Park – Minutes to Midnight (strings)
Maroon 5 – It Won't Be Soon Before Long (strings)
Martina McBride – Waking Up Laughing (strings)
Sara Bareilles – Little Voice (strings)
Scorpions – Humanity Hour 1 (strings)
The Spill Canvas – No Really, I'm Fine
Sum 41 – Underclass Hero (strings)
X Japan – Jealousy (strings)

2006

Beck – The Information
Beyoncé – B'Day
Antonio Carmona – Vengo Venenoso
Celestial Navigations – Connection: Chapter 5
Celestial Navigations – Live at the Matrix (keyboards, strings, vocals)
Charlotte Gainsbourg – The Songs That We Sing (strings)
Dixie Chicks – Taking the Long Way (strings)
Dreamgirls – Dreamgirls: Music from the Motion Picture
Evanescence – The Open Door (strings)
Five for Fighting – Two Lights (strings)
Frankie J – Priceless
Goo Goo Dolls – Let Love In (strings)
Jewel – Goodbye Alice in Wonderland
Johnny Cash – American V: A Hundred Highways (strings)
Josh Groban – Awake (strings)
Juanes – Mi Sangre (strings)
Julio Iglesias – Romantic Classics
Justin Timberlake – FutureSex/LoveSounds (strings)
Keith Urban – Love, Pain & the Whole Crazy Thing
Live – Songs from Black Mountain (strings)
Meat Loaf – Bat Out of Hell III: The Monster Is Loose
My Chemical Romance – The Black Parade (strings, horns)
Nelly Furtado – Loose (strings)
Rascal Flatts – Me and My Gang (strings)
Raul Malo – You're Only Lonely
Sarah Kelly – Where the Past Meets Today

2005

Alex Lloyd – Alex Lloyd
Anastacia – Pieces of a Dream
B. B. King – B.B. King & Friends: 80 (strings)
Beck – Guero
Billy Joel – My Lives
Bon Jovi – Have a Nice Day
David Crowder Band – A Collision (strings)
Daniel Bedingfield – Second First Impression
Eric Benét – Hurricane
Fort Minor – The Rising Tied (strings)
Gary Allan – Tough All Over
Gustavo Santaolalla – Brokeback Mountain: Original Motion Picture Soundtrack
Gustavo Santaolalla – North Country: Music from the Motion Picture
Idlewild – Not Just Sometimes But Always (strings)
Leonard Cohen: I'm Your Man – Motion Picture Soundtrack
Lindsay Lohan – A Little More Personal (Raw)
Lisa Marie Presley – Now What
Liz Phair – Somebody's Miracle (strings)
The Mars Volta – Frances the Mute (strings, brass, piano, percussion)
Melanie – Photograph
Montgomery Gentry – Something to Be Proud Of: The Best of 1999–2005
Neil Diamond – 12 Songs (horns)
Paul McCartney – Chaos and Creation in the Backyard (strings)
The Prom Kings – The Prom Kings
Robbie Williams – Intensive Care (strings)
Sheryl Crow – Wildflower (strings)
Steven Curtis Chapman – The Chronicles of Narnia: The Lion, the Witch and the Wardrobe (strings)

2004

Alter Bridge – One Day Remains (strings)
Ashlee Simpson – Autobiography (strings)
Avril Lavigne – Under My Skin (strings)
Charlotte Martin – On Your Shore
Diana DeGarmo – Blue Skies
Everlast – White Trash Beautiful
Fantasia – Free Yourself
Five for Fighting – The Battle for Everything
Good Charlotte – The Chronicles of Life and Death
Graham Colton Band – Drive
Jimmy Eat World – Futures
Kelly Clarkson – Breakaway
Lindsay Lohan – Speak
Lit – Lit
Lostprophets – Start Something (strings)
New Found Glory – Catalyst (strings)
Spymob – Sitting Around Keeping Score
Tamyra Gray – The Dreamer
Tim McGraw – Live Like You Were Dying (strings)
Train – Alive at Last
Van Hunt – Van Hunt
Wilson Phillips – California

2003

Alien Ant Farm – truANT
The Bangles – Doll Revolution
Blackstreet – Level II
Cat Power – You Are Free
Evanescence – Fallen
Eve 6 – It's All in Your Head
Kiss  – Kiss Symphony: Alive IV
Lamb – Between Darkness and Wonder
Linkin Park – Meteora (strings)
Lisa Marie Presley – To Whom It May Concern (strings)
Macy Gray – The Trouble with Being Myself
Maria – My Soul
Memento – Beginnings
Michelle Branch – Hotel Paper
Nelly Furtado – Folklore
Phil Collins – Brother Bear: An Original Walt Disney Records Soundtrack
Revis – Places for Breathing
Ricky Martin – Almas del Silencio
Ruben Studdard – Soulful (strings)
The Thrills – So Much for the City
Year of the Rabbit – Year of the Rabbit

2002

Beck – Sea Change
Darren Hayes – Spin
Def Leppard – X (strings)
Faith Hill – Cry (strings)
Good Charlotte – The Young and the Hopeless (strings)
Laura Pausini – From the Inside
LeAnn Rimes – Twisted Angel
Mariah Carey – Charmbracelet (strings)
Robin Williams – Live 2002
Sixpence None the Richer – Divine Discontent (strings)
The Wallflowers – Red Letter Days (strings)
Taproot – Welcome (strings)
3 Doors Down – Away from the Sun (strings)

2001

Aerosmith – Just Push Play (strings)
Anastacia – Freak of Nature (strings)
Brooks & Dunn – Steers & Stripes
Jennifer Warnes – The Well
Leonard Cohen – Ten New Songs
Lit – Atomic (strings)
Michael Jackson – Invincible (strings)
Nikka Costa – Everybody Got Their Something (strings)
Paul McCartney – Driving Rain (strings)
Smash Mouth – Smash Mouth
Train – Drops of Jupiter (strings)
Alien Ant Farm - ANThology (strings)

2000

BBMak – Sooner or Later
Bon Jovi – Crush (strings)
Duran Duran – Pop Trash (strings)
Everlast – Eat at Whitey's (strings)
Fuel – Something Like Human (strings)
XXVII Olympiad – Official Music from the Opening Ceremony
Green Day – Warning (strings)
Poe – Poe
Ricky Martin – Sound Loaded
Sinéad O'Connor – Faith and Courage

1999

Amanda Marshall – Tuesday's Child (strings)
Beck – Midnite Vultures
Counting Crows – This Desert Life
Emmylou Harris, Linda Ronstadt, Dolly Parton – Trio II (strings)
Enrique Iglesias – Enrique
Los Fabulosos Cadillacs – Aguila
Macy Gray – On How Life Is
Phil Collins – Tarzan: An Original Walt Disney Records Soundtrack
Reef – Rides
Ricky Martin – Ricky Martin
Stone Temple Pilots – No. 4
Styx - Brave New World (conductor, strings)
21st Century Girls – 21st Century Girls

1998

Alanis Morissette – Supposed Former Infatuation Junkie (strings)
Beck – Mutations
The Black Crowes – By Your Side
Goo Goo Dolls – Dizzy Up the Girl (strings)
Hole – Celebrity Skin
Jude – No One Is Really Beautiful (strings)
Hootie & the Blowfish – Musical Chairs
Richie Sambora – Undiscovered Soul

1997

Aerosmith – Nine Lives
Beck – Odelay B Sides
Billy Joel – Greatest Hits Volume III
Green Day – Nimrod
Lee Seung-Hwan – Cycle
Leonard Cohen – More Best of
Kara's Flowers – The Fourth World
Stanley Clarke – The Bass-ic Collection

1996

Journey – Trial by Fire
Cracker – The Golden Age
Dead Man Walking  – Dead Man Walking: The Score (choir)
France Gall – France (strings)
Joe Cocker – Organic
John Berry – Faces
Manowar – Louder Than Hell

1995

3T – Free Willy 2: The Adventure Home
Bon Jovi – These Days
Bugs & Friends – Sing the Beatles
Joshua Kadison – Delilah Blue
Kris Kristofferson – A Moment of Forever
Lee Seung-Hwan – "For 1,000 days"
Medicine – Her Highness
Melissa Manchester – If My Heart Had Wings
Tina Arena – Don't Ask
Various Artists – Tower of Song: The Songs of Leonard Cohen

1994

Aerosmith – "Crazy"
Bon Jovi – "Always"
Bonnie Raitt – Longing in Their Hearts
The Rolling Stones – Voodoo Lounge (strings)
Willie Nelson – Healing Hands of Time

1993

Aerosmith – "Amazing"
Alexander O'Neal – Love Makes No Sense
Celine Dion – The Colour of My Love
David Crosby – Thousand Roads (strings)
Jann Arden – Time for Mercy
Maria McKee – You Gotta Sin to Get Saved
Willie Nelson – Across the Borderline

1992

Bernadette Peters – Bernadette
Leonard Cohen – The Future (strings, backing vocals)
Neil Diamond – The Christmas Album
Roy Orbison – King of Hearts
Vonda Shepard – Radical Light

1991

Aaron Neville – Warm Your Heart
Alice Cooper –  Hey Stoopid
Bonnie Raitt – Luck of the Draw
Neil Diamond – Lovescape
Diana Ross – The Force Behind the Power
The Temptations – Milestone
The Smithereens – Blow Up
X – Jealousy

1989

Linda Ronstadt – Cry Like a Rainstorm, Howl Like the Wind

1987

Dolly Parton – Rainbow
Dolly Parton, Linda Ronstadt, & Emmylou Harris – Trio

1986

10,000 Maniacs – In My Tribe

1983

All the Right Moves – All the Right Moves Soundtrack

1981

Art Garfunkel – Scissors Cut
Rita Coolidge – Heartbreak Radio
Robin Williamson – Songs of Love and Parting
Gábor Szabó – Femme Fatale

1979

Louise Goffin – Kid Blue
Maria Muldaur – Open Your Eyes
Badfinger – Airwaves
David Castle – Love You Forever
Karla Bonoff – Restless Nights
Olivia Hussey – Melancholy Café / Arabesque
Crystal Mansion – The Crystal Mansion

1978

Andrew Gold – All This and Heaven Too
Carole Bayer Sager – ... Too
Poco – Legend
John Hall – John Hall
Laura Allan – Laura Allan
Eddie Rabbitt – Variations
Leo Sayer – Leo Sayer
Rare Earth – Band Together
Rare Earth – Grand Slam
Dusty Springfield – It Begins Again
Starland Vocal Band – Late Nite Radio
James Vincent – Waiting For The Rain
Kate & Anna McGarrigle – Pronto Monto

1977

Art Garfunkel – Watermark
Cat Stevens – Izitso
Lucy Simon – Stolen Time
James Taylor – JT
Karla Bonoff – Karla Bonoff
Linda Ronstadt – Simple Dreams
Olivia Newton-John – Making a Good Thing Better
Carole Bayer Sager – Carole Bayer Sager
Wendy Waldman – The Main Refrain
Jelly – A True Story

1976

Jackson Browne – The Pretender
J. D. Souther – Black Rose
Jimmie Spheeris – Ports of the Heart
Linda Ronstadt – Hasten Down the Wind
Melanie – Photograph
Pure Prairie League – Dance
Mr Big – Photographic Smile
Tom Snow – Tom Snow
Richard Supa – Life Lines

1975

Jimmie Spheeris – The Dragon Is Dancing
Linda Ronstadt – Prisoner in Disguise
Karen Alexander – Isn't It Always Love
Emperor – Woman & The Time That It Takes
Wings Livinryte – Your Love Keeps Me Off The Streets

1974

Carole King – Wrap Around Joy
Linda Ronstadt – Heart Like a Wheel
Rita Coolidge – Fall into Spring
Jackson Browne – Late for the Sky

1973

Carole King – Fantasy
Jimmie Spheeris – Original Tap Dancing Kid
Jackson Browne – For Everyman

1972

Carole King – Rhymes & Reasons
Jackson Browne – Jackson Browne (viola)
Jimmie Spheeris – Isle of View

Filmography
Partial list of films that David Campbell's work contributed to.

Personal life
Campbell has two sons and one daughter: musician Beck Hansen, artist Channing Hansen, and Alyssa Suede.

He is married to theatrical composer Pauline Frechette (aka Raven Kane).

Campbell is a long-time practicing Scientologist.

In 2012, he donated to Ron Paul's campaign in the United States Presidential election.

See also
List of music arrangers

References

1948 births
Living people
American male conductors (music)
American male composers
American music arrangers
American Scientologists
Beck
Canadian emigrants to the United States
Former Presbyterians
Manhattan School of Music alumni
Musicians from Toronto
21st-century American conductors (music)